Miss La Union (Mutia Ti La Union in Ilocano) is an annual beauty pageant search in the province of La Union in the Philippines. It started in 2002 during the anniversary of the founding of the province (March 2, 1850).

The Municipality of Agoo is the most successful municipality in Mutia Ti La Union. They have 8 titles in total. Agoo is the only municipality to crown her successor from within the same Municipality six times in a row from 2012 to 2017.

The reigning "Mutia Ti La Union" is Kristine Billy Mateo Tabaday of Sudipen, who was crowned on March 2, 2023, at the Baywalk Poro Point in City of San Fernando, La Union. This marks the third consecutive year of the municipality of Sudipen taking home the Mutia ti La Union crown, with Tabaday following the 2019-2020 back to back wins of Meghan Sanglay and Divina Marie Villanueva from the same town.

First Edition (Miss La Union 2002) 

The First edition of Miss La Union (Rebranded as Mutya Ng La Union) was held in San Fernando, La Union which is the capital city of the province. the very first Miss La Union was Rochelle Gualberto of the Municipality of Bauang.

Participating municipalities

Mutia Ti La Union winners by year

Winners from each municipality

Notes

 The Municipality of Agoo has had the most winners in this pageant since 2002 (in 2006, 2009, 2012, 2013, 2014, 2015, 2016 and 2017)
 The Municipality of Bauang has the second highest placements in this pageant next to Agoo Semi Finalists: 2003, 2004, 2005, 2006, 2009, 2010, 2012 and 2014. Runners Up: 2007, 2011, 2013, 2015, 2016. and Two Winners in 2002 and 2004.
 The City of San Fernando, La Union tied with Bauang has also the same numbers of placements in the pageant.

Contestant/winners competed in national and international pageant 

 Aiyana Mikiewicz (Agoo 2012, Winner) - Bb. Pilipinas Gold Candidate, Miss Tourism World Philippines 2013 / Miss Tourism World Asia 2013
 Sheryl Lou Franco (Aringay) - Miss Philippines Earth Water 2003, Miss Tourism World 2005 (Best in National Costume)
 Sheryl Ann Ducusin (San Fernando City) - Miss Philippines Earth Fire 2002
 Medard Angela German (Bauang) - Miss Philippines Earth 2005 Candidate
 Fatima Glenna Cabilatazan (Agoo 2005, Winner) -  Miss Philippines Earth Candidate 2006
 Ma. Kristina Tabas (Pugo 2008, Mutia Ti Kalikasan) -  Miss Philippines Earth Candidate 2008
 Anna Katrina Bautista (San Fernando City 2007, Winner) - Miss Philippines Earth 2007 / Turismo Pilipina 2008 3rd Runner Up
 Kimberle Mae Penchon (Agoo 2013, Winner) - Miss Beauche International 2014 (Winner), Binibining Pilipinas 2016 Top 15 Semifinalist
 Mabel Joy Verceiles (Bauang 2013, Mutia Ti Kalikasan) - Miss Philippines Earth 2014 Candidate
 Rochelle Saavedra (Bauang 2010, Semifinalist) - Miss Bikini Philippines 2010 Candidate
 Maria Heidie Ronato (Bauang/Agoo 2014, Winner) - Miss Bikini Philippines 2010 Candidate
 Brendolf Muñoz (San Fernando/Bauang 2010, Muti Ti Turismo) - Miss Philippines Earth 2010 Candidate
 Christine Joy Picardal (Rosario 2013, Semifinalist) - Miss Diamond Philippines 2016 (Appointed), Miss Diamond Of The World 2016 Winner
 Carina Cariño (Agoo, Mutia Ti La Union 2017) - Miss Millennial Philippines 2017 Candidate, Miss Millennial Philippines 2017 First Runner Up, Binibining Pilipinas 2020 Candidate (due to the pandemic, the coronation night moved to July 11,2021, from April 2020)
 Trizia Ocampo (Agoo, Mutia Ti La Union 2016) - Miss World Philippines 2017 Candidate
 Shawntel Cruz (Santo Tomas, Mutia Ti Turismo La Union 2017) Miss World Philippines 2017 Candidate

Culture of La Union
Beauty pageants in the Philippines